The Perth Theatre Trust is a statutory authority which manages and operates cultural venues in Western Australia. It manages His Majesty's Theatre, the State Theatre Centre of Western Australia, the Subiaco Arts Centre (leased from the City of Subiaco), the Albany Entertainment Centre, the Goldfields Arts Centre and the Perth Cultural Centre. The Trust leases the Perth Concert Hall from the City of Perth but the venue is managed by WA Venue and Events. The Trust also has a Museum of Performing Arts based in the His Majesty's Theatre building.

History
The Trust was created in 1980 to manage theatre properties in the central business district of Perth, Western Australia. This involved bringing the Perth Concert Hall and His Majesty's Theatre within a single administrative unit. The Trust also incorporated and inherited records from preceding bodies, such as the National Theatre Company (W.A.) and the Perth Repertory Club, which had been established in 1919.

The now defunct Playhouse Theatre and the Subiaco Arts Centre were later included in the Trust's scope.

Activities of the Trust included the re-opening of a renovated His Majesty's Theatre in 1980. Activities included publications advertising theatre in Perth.

From 2015, the Trust began to directly manage His Majesty's Theatre, the State Theatre Centre of Western Australia, Perth Concert Hall and Subiaco Arts Centre, after fifteen years of outsourcing operations to AEG Ogden.

The Trust leases the Goldfields Arts Centre in Kalgoorlie to the City of Kalgoorlie-Boulder. On 1 July 2018, the Trust assumed responsibility for the management and activation of the Perth Cultural Centre precinct from the Metropolitan Redevelopment Authority.

References

External links
 

1980 establishments in Australia
Theatre in Australia